Maurice Girardot (December 22, 1921 – February 8, 2020) was a French basketball player. He competed in the 1948 Summer Olympics. Girardot was part of the French basketball team, which won the silver medal.

Girardot died on February 8, 2020, at the age of 98.

References

External links
profile

1921 births
2020 deaths
Basketball players at the 1948 Summer Olympics
French men's basketball players
Medalists at the 1948 Summer Olympics
Olympic basketball players of France
Olympic medalists in basketball
Olympic silver medalists for France